Ingleby is a hamlet in the civil parish of Saxilby with Ingleby, in the West Lindsey district of Lincolnshire, England.

Ingleby comprised three areas, North Ingleby, South Ingleby and Low Ingleby.

Ingleby is recorded three times as "Englebi" in the Domesday Book; in 1086 it comprised 38 households, which for the time was considered very large.

In North Ingleby there are earthworks of a scheduled manor complex centred on a moated enclosure now occupied by Ingleby Hall Farm. Documents in 1569–70 record a Deer Park in the area.  It is also believed there was a church or chapel here – Saxilby church has a list of incumbents for Ingleby church – dating from 1086 to 1416.

At South Ingleby there are earthworks for another manor, an island refuge contained within a moat, on the site of Ingleby Grange.

References

External links 

Hamlets in Lincolnshire
West Lindsey District